Matthias Trenson (born 3 October 1986) is a Belgian football player, who plays for KFC Lille in the Belgian Provincial Leagues as a defender.

Club career
Trenson started his professional career with Sint-Truiden, but was born in Bruges and spent his youth career mostly with Club Brugge.

References

External links
 
 

1986 births
Living people
Belgian footballers
Sint-Truidense V.V. players
Royal Antwerp F.C. players
Enosis Neon Paralimni FC players
K.V.C. Westerlo players
Oud-Heverlee Leuven players
Belgian Pro League players
Challenger Pro League players
Cypriot First Division players
Belgian expatriate footballers
Expatriate footballers in Cyprus
Footballers from Bruges
Association football defenders
Belgian expatriate sportspeople in Cyprus